Progress MS-19, Russian production No.449, identified by NASA as Progress 80P, was a Progress spaceflight launched by Roscosmos to resupply the International Space Station (ISS). This was the 172nd flight of a Progress spacecraft.

History 
The Progress-MS is an uncrewed freighter based on the Progress-M featuring improved avionics. This improved variant first launched on 21 December 2015. It has the following improvements:

 New external compartment that enables it to deploy satellites. Each compartment can hold up to four launch containers. First time installed on Progress MS-03
 Enhanced redundancy thanks to the addition of a backup system of electrical motors for the docking and sealing mechanism
 Improved Micrometeoroid (MMOD) protection with additional panels in the cargo compartment
 Luch Russian relay satellites link capabilities enable telemetry and control even when not in direct view of ground radio stations
 GNSS autonomous navigation enables real time determination of the status vector and orbital parameters dispensing with the need of ground station orbit determination.
 Real time relative navigation thanks to direct radio data exchange capabilities with the space station
 New digital radio that enables enhanced TV camera view for the docking operations
 The Ukrainian Chezara Kvant-V on board radio system and antenna/feeder system has been replaced with a Unified Command Telemetry System (UCTS)
 Replacement of the KURS-A with KURS-NA digital system

Launch 
On 3 February 2021, the State Commission for Testing of the Piloted Space Systems, chaired by Roskosmos head Dmitry Rogozin, approved the latest ISS schedule for 2021 and the first quarter of 2022.

A Soyuz-2.1a will launch Progress MS-19 to the International Space Station from Baikonur Site 31 on 16 February 2022 on a fast-track trajectory. Around 3 hours 20 minutes after the launch, Progress MS-19 will automatically dock to the zenith (space-facing) port of the MIM2 Poisk module and continue its mission for 368 days, supporting Expedition 66 and Expedition 67 missions aboard the ISS.

Cargo 

 Dry cargo: 
 Fuel: 
 Oxygen: 
 Water: 

Also delivered to ISS by progress were 6 Russian experimental cubesats (ЮЗГУ No.5 - 10 / SWSU No5 - 10), which were deployed from the ISS by Russian Cosmonaut Oleg Artemyev during EVA 3 spacewalk. See 2022 List of spacecraft deployed from the International Space Station.

See also 
 Uncrewed spaceflights to the International Space Station

References 

Progress (spacecraft) missions
2022 in Russia
Spacecraft launched in 2022
Supply vehicles for the International Space Station
Spacecraft launched by Soyuz-2 rockets
February 2022 events in Russia
Spacecraft which reentered in 2022